Gymnophthalmus underwoodi, called commonly Underwood's spectacled tegu, is a species of microteiid lizard, which is found in South America and on certain Caribbean islands.

Etymology
G. underwoodi is named after British herpetologist Garth Leon Underwood.

Reproduction
G. underwoodi is a unisexual species, reproducing through parthenogenesis.  Captive specimens have been recorded laying up to eleven eggs within four months, with between one and four eggs per clutch.

Geographic range
The geographic distribution of G. underwoodi includes the islands of Guadeloupe, Martinique, Saint Vincent and the Grenadines, Barbados, Antigua, Barbuda, Trinidad, and Tobago in the Lesser Antilles; and Guyana, Suriname, Colombia, and Venezuela in South America.  It is also present on Dominica, which has been confirmed by both Breuil (2002) and Turk et al. (2010). A recent incursion on Saba has led to a widely occurring non-native population on the island.

Habitat
The preferred natural habitat of G. underwoodi is grassland.

Sources

References

External links
Gymnophthalmus underwoodi  at the Encyclopedia of Life.
Gymnophthalmus underwoodi  at the Reptile Database.

Further reading
Grant C (1958). "A New Gymnophthalmus (Reptilia, Teiidae) from Barbados, B.W.I." Herpetologica 14 (4): 227–228. (Gymnophthalmus underwoodi, new species).
Schwartz A, Henderson RW (1991). Amphibians and Reptiles of the West Indies: Descriptions, Distributions, and Natural History. Gainesville: University of Florida Press. 720 pp. . (Gymnophthalmus underwoodi, p. 411).
Schwartz A, Thomas R (1975). A Check-list of West Indian Amphibians and Reptiles. Carnegie Museum of Natural History Special Publication No. 1. Pittsburgh, Pennsylvania: Carnegie Museum of Natural History. 216 pp. (Gymnophthalmus underwoodi, pp. 123–124).
Turk PA, Wyszynski NN, Powell R, Henderson RW (2010). "Population densities and water-loss rates of Gymnophthalmus pleii, Gymnophthalmus underwoodi (Gymnophthalmidae), and Sphaerodactylus fantasticus fuga (Sphaerodactylidae) on Dominica, West Indies". Salamandra 46 (3): 125–130.
Williamson KE, Powell R (2004). "Gymnophthalmus underwoodii ". Catalogue of American Amphibians and Reptiles (793): 1–5.

Gymnophthalmus
Lizards of the Caribbean
Lizards of South America
Reptiles of Colombia
Reptiles of Suriname
Reptiles of Venezuela
Reptiles described in 1958
Taxa named by Chapman Grant